Marcos Paz is the capital of Marcos Paz Partido, in the Greater Buenos Aires urban agglomeration in the Argentine province of Buenos Aires, located 48 kilometres west of Buenos Aires.

Although the city of Marcos Paz was officially founded in 1878, the city was first established in 1870, near the Estación Coronel Doctor Marcos Paz railway station. With a population of 39.529 (INDEC 2001), it is the county's largest (and only) city.

Famous residents
 Juan Carlos Onganía Carballo (1914–1995), military dictator and President of Argentina from 29 June 1966 to 8 June 1970.
 Jorge Rafael Videla (1925–2013), military dictator and President of Argentina from 29 March 1976 to 29 March 1981.
 Rodolfo Arruabarrena, football player, coach
 Braian Toledo, Olympic javelinist

External links

 Municipal website
 Marcos Paz Noticias

Marcos Paz Partido
Populated places in Buenos Aires Province
Populated places established in 1878
Cities in Argentina